Ulrich Wildgruber (18 November 1937 – 30 November 1999) was a German actor. He started working on stage in 1963 and is best known for playing Othello in the Deutsches Schauspielhaus in Hamburg. He also played in more than fifty films from 1970 to 1999. Wildgruber committed suicide at the age of 62.

Filmography

Awards
 1986 Bundesverdienstkreuz 1. Klasse

References

External links 

1937 births
1999 deaths
Officers Crosses of the Order of Merit of the Federal Republic of Germany
German male film actors
German male stage actors
20th-century German male actors